James "Buster" Douglas (born April 7, 1960) is an American former professional boxer who competed between 1981 and 1999. He reigned as undisputed world heavyweight champion in 1990 after  knocking out Mike Tyson to win the title. His win over Tyson is regarded as one of the  biggest upsets in boxing history.

Douglas was a 42-to-1 underdog going into his 1990 fight against Tyson, who was undefeated and considered to be the best boxer in the world for his domination of the division over the previous three years. Defying expectations, Douglas knocked out Tyson in the 10th round to claim the WBC, WBA, and IBF titles. He reigned as the world heavyweight champion for eight months until he was defeated by Evander Holyfield in his only title defense. Retiring shortly after the loss, Douglas returned to boxing between 1996 and 1999 until he retired a second and final time.

Early life
The son of professional boxer William "Dynamite" Douglas and Lula Pearl Douglas, Douglas grew up in Columbus, Ohio, in the predominantly black Linden neighborhood of Windsor Terrace. It was his father, who ran a gym at the Blackburn Recreation Center near Downtown Columbus, and subsequently introduced young James to boxing (in the same way James would later bring his son Lamar to the same gym). He attended Linden McKinley High School, where he played football and basketball, leading Linden to a Class AAA state basketball championship in 1977.  After high school, Douglas played basketball for the Coffeyville Community College Red Ravens in Coffeyville, Kansas, from 1977 to 1978; the 17-year-old was a 6'0" power forward. He is in the Coffeyville Community College Men's Basketball Hall of Fame. He also played basketball at Sinclair Community College from 1979 to 1980 in Dayton, Ohio, before attending Mercyhurst University on a basketball scholarship. He moved back to Columbus to focus on boxing.

Professional career

Douglas made his debut on May 31, 1981, and defeated Dan O'Malley in a four-round bout. He was managed by John Johnson (former Ohio State assistant football coach.) He won his first five fights before coming into a fight with David Bey twenty pounds heavier than he usually did in his early fights. Bey knocked Douglas out in the second round to hand him his first defeat. After six more fights, all wins, Douglas fought Steffen Tangstad to a draw on October 16, 1982. He was penalized two points during the course of the fight which proved to be the difference.

After the draw Douglas beat largely journeyman fighters over the next fourteen months. Two of his wins were against Jesse Clark. Douglas fought him a total of three times and knocked him out all three times. In his last fight of 1983, Douglas was dominating opponent Mike White, but White knocked him out in the ninth round.

On November 9, Douglas was scheduled to fight heavyweight contender Trevor Berbick in Las Vegas. Berbick pulled out of the bout three days before it was scheduled and Randall "Tex" Cobb elected to take the fight in Berbick's place. Douglas defeated the former heavyweight contender by winning a majority decision. The next year, he fought up-and-coming contender Jesse Ferguson. In 1986, Douglas fought only three times, defeating former champion Greg Page and fringe contender David Jaco in two of the fights. This earned him a shot at the International Boxing Federation championship that Michael Spinks was stripped of for refusing to defend it. Douglas started well against Tony Tucker and was ahead on points, but he ran out of gas and was stopped in the tenth round.

After the Tucker defeat and series of disagreements, James split with his father; the Douglas family was shattered, and James started business from scratch and handpicked another team for himself, particularly a new trainer. This won him four consecutive fights and he went on to fight Trevor Berbick in 1989, winning by a unanimous decision. He followed that up with a unanimous decision victory over future heavyweight champion Oliver McCall, and earned a shot at the undisputed heavyweight championship held by Mike Tyson, who became the universally recognized champion after knocking out Spinks in one round in 1988. (Douglas fought on the undercard of the event and defeated Mike Williams by TKO in seven rounds.)

Undisputed heavyweight champion

The fight against Mike Tyson was scheduled for February 11, 1990, and took place in Tokyo at the Tokyo Dome. Almost everyone assumed that the bout was going to be another quick knockout for the champion. No challenger had taken Tyson beyond the fifth round since 1987. Many thought it was just an easy tune-up for Tyson before a future mega-fight with undefeated Evander Holyfield, who had recently moved up to heavyweight from cruiserweight where he became the first boxer to be the undisputed champion of the weight class.  Douglas was given so little chance of lasting against Tyson, let alone beating him, that nearly every betting parlor in Las Vegas refused to hold odds for the fight.  The one casino that did, The Mirage, made Douglas a 42-to-1 underdog.

Douglas's mother, Lula Pearl, suddenly died at the age of 46, 23 days before the title bout. Douglas, who had trained hard, surprised the world by dominating the fight from the beginning, using his 12-inch reach advantage to perfection. He seemingly hit Tyson at will with jabs and right hands and danced out of range of Tyson's own punches. The champion had not taken Douglas seriously, expecting another quick and easy knockout victory. He was slow, refusing to move his head and slip his way in (his usual effective strategy) but rather setting his feet and throwing big, lunging hooks, repeatedly trying to beat Douglas with single punches. By the fifth round, Tyson's left eye was swelling shut from Douglas's many right jabs, and ringside HBO announcers proclaimed it was the most punishment they had ever seen the champion absorb. Larry Merchant memorably added, "Well, if Mike Tyson, who loves pigeons, was looking for a pigeon in this bout, he hasn't found him."

Tyson's cornermen appeared to be unprepared for the suddenly dire situation. They had not brought an endswell or an ice pack to the fight, so they were forced to put tap water into a latex glove to hold over Tyson's swelling eye. By the end of the fight, Tyson's eye had swollen almost completely shut. In the eighth round, Tyson landed a right uppercut that knocked Douglas down. The referee's count created controversy as Douglas was on his feet when the referee reached nine, although the official knockdown timekeeper was two seconds ahead. In the ring, the final arbiter of the knockdown seconds is the referee and a comparison with Douglas's winning knockdown count issued to Tyson two rounds later revealed that both fighters had received long counts.

Tyson came out aggressively in the dramatic ninth round and continued his attempts to end the fight with one big punch hoping that Douglas was still hurt from the eighth round knockdown. Both men traded punches before Douglas connected on a multi-punch combination that staggered Tyson back to the ropes. With Tyson hurt along the ropes Douglas unleashed a vicious attack to try to finish off a dazed Tyson but, amazingly, Tyson withstood the punishment and barely survived the ninth round. In the tenth round, the severe punishment Douglas had inflicted on Tyson finally began to take its toll on the champion.  Douglas dominated the round from the outset. While setting Tyson up with his jab Douglas scored a huge uppercut that snapped Tyson's head upward. He followed with a rapid four-punch combination to the head, and knocked Tyson down for the first time in his career. Tyson struggled to his knees and picked up his mouthpiece lying on the mat next to him. He awkwardly attempted to place it back into his mouth. The image of Tyson with the mouthpiece hanging crookedly from his lips would become an enduring image from the fight. He was unable to beat the referee's count, and Douglas was the new world heavyweight champion. As Douglas said in an interview years later, “I thought Tyson was getting up until I had seen him looking for that mouth piece and then I knew that he was really hurt. So anytime you know you only got ten seconds to get up so you aren’t going to worry about anything but just getting up first. So when I had seen him looking around for that mouth piece I knew he was really hurt.”

Douglas's joy over the victory soon turned to confusion and anger as manager John Johnson informed him in the dressing room that Tyson and Don King were lodging an official protest about the referee's knockdown count in the eighth round. A week later, during a television interview, Douglas said that the protest and the post-fight confusion ruined what should have been the best time of his life.

Losing the title

Although the IBF immediately recognized Douglas as its champion, the WBA and WBC initially refused due to Tyson's protest. However, Tyson withdrew his protest four days later amid worldwide public outcry and demands from boxing commissions around the world, and Douglas was officially recognized as undisputed heavyweight champion.

While still champion, Douglas appeared on the February 23, 1990 episode of the World Wrestling Federation's The Main Event III, as special guest referee for a rematch between Hulk Hogan and "Macho Man" Randy Savage. Originally, Tyson was scheduled to be the guest referee, but following the upset, the WWF rushed to sign on Douglas for the event. At the end of the match, Douglas was provoked into a kayfabe punch and knockout of Savage, who was the heel wrestler in the match.

The defeated Tyson clamored for a rematch and Douglas was offered more money than he had ever made for a fight. Not wanting to deal with Tyson's camp or his promoter Don King, Douglas decided to make his first defense against #1 contender Evander Holyfield, who had watched the new champion dethrone Tyson from ringside in Tokyo. Douglas went into the October 25, 1990 fight at 246 pounds, 15 pounds heavier than he was for the Tyson match and also the heaviest he had weighed in for a fight since a 1985 bout with Dion Simpson, in which he tipped the scale at just over 247 pounds.

Douglas came out rather sluggish, and was thoroughly dominated by Holyfield during the first two rounds. In the third round Douglas attempted to hit Holyfield with a hard uppercut that he telegraphed. Holyfield avoided the uppercut and knocked an off-balance Douglas to the canvas with a straight right to the chin. Douglas merely lay flat on his back, motionless and disoriented, as referee Mills Lane stopped the fight. Buster Douglas retired after that bout.

Later career
Douglas vs Holyfield was a reported $24.6 million payday for Douglas. Doing little for the next several years, Douglas gained weight, reaching nearly 400 pounds. It was only after he nearly died during a diabetic coma that he decided to attempt a return to the sport. He went back into training and made a comeback. He was successful at first, winning six straight fights, but his comeback almost came to a halt in a 1997 disqualification win over journeyman Louis Monaco. In a bizarre ending, Monaco landed a right hand, just after the bell ending round one, that knocked Douglas to the canvas. Douglas was unable to continue after a five-minute rest period and was consequently awarded the win by disqualification (on account of Monaco's illegal punch).

A fight with light-heavyweight champion Roy Jones Jr. was touted in the late 1990s, although ultimately fell through. In 1998, Douglas was knocked out in the first round of a fight with heavyweight contender Lou Savarese. Douglas subsequently had two more fights, winning both, and retired in 1999 with a final record of 38–6–1.

In the media

Douglas made a guest appearance in the 1990s cop show Street Justice.

Douglas made his feature film acting debut in the Artie Knapp science fiction comedy film Pluto's Plight.

The 1988 arcade game Final Blow was released as James 'Buster' Douglas Knockout Boxing in 1990 for the Sega Master System and Sega Genesis, which replaced one of the fictional fighters with Douglas. This game is considered as a response to Nintendo's Mike Tyson's Punch-Out!!, especially since Tyson lost to Douglas, which Sega took advantage in order to promote their early "Genesis does what Nintendon't" advertisements – an advertising campaign in which Douglas frequently participated.

In 1995, HBO aired Tyson, a television movie based upon the life of Mike Tyson.  Douglas was portrayed by actor Duane Davis.

On February 23, 1990, Douglas made a special appearance as a guest referee on WWF's The Main Event III in a match-up between Hulk Hogan and "Macho Man" Randy Savage. Mike Tyson was originally scheduled to be the special guest referee, but this changed following Douglas's knockout title win over Tyson just under two weeks before, on February 11.

Douglas's upset against Tyson is the inspiration for The Killers' song "Tyson vs Douglas" from their Wonderful Wonderful album. Singer songwriter Brandon Flowers used the childhood memory of watching the seemingly invincible Tyson lose, as the motivation for a song that's about "me and my family, and the way I’m perceived by my kids. I don’t want them to see me go down like Tyson".

Honors
Douglas is one of the few non-students to be honored by Ohio State University with the opportunity to dot the "i" during the performance of the Script Ohio by The Ohio State University Marching Band.

Professional boxing record

See also
List of heavyweight boxing champions
List of undisputed boxing champions

References

 "Buster Douglas's Knockout BBQ". Fox News. 2010-07-20.

External links

Cyber Boxing Zone
ESPN.com
Video of Douglas knocking out Mike Tyson
 Christof Gertsch, Mikael Krogerus: Der letzte Kampf. In: Das Magazin No. 39, 26. September 2020,  p. 10–35 (online Part 1; Part 2; German)

1960 births
African-American boxers
American male boxers
American men's basketball players
Boxers from Columbus, Ohio
Coffeyville Red Ravens men's basketball players
International Boxing Federation champions
Living people
People with type 1 diabetes
World Boxing Association champions
World Boxing Council champions
World heavyweight boxing champions
21st-century African-American people
20th-century African-American sportspeople